Exit consent is a formal agreement that allows a majority group of creditors holding sovereign bonds to change the non-financial terms of the bonds in a way that makes the bonds effectively worthless for the minority holdouts, motivating them to accept a restructuring offer.   Thus creditors willing to restructure can outmaneuver holdouts by using the supermajority voting features of existing bonds to secure changes, which reduce their value as they are tendered in exchange for restructured debt.

Reason
Government bond issued by sovereign nations are often perceived as safe investments.  But over time, countries in difficult economic situations have needed to restructure their debt structure, or see their national economy collapse.  During that process, the country must restructure the outstanding debt by offering its old bonds holders new instruments that reflect new financial terms.  It is a process that sees the emergence of holdout creditors who refuse the proposed restructuring, posing a problem to the reorganization process the holdout problem. Therefore, the threat of an exit consent is used to encourage (or coerce) minority creditors to accept the exchange offer so they are not left with diminished bonds.

See also
Debt restructuring
Refinancing
Troubled Debt Restructuring
Vulture fund

References

Bonds (finance)